Buckman is an unincorporated community in the towns of Eaton and New Denmark, Brown County, Wisconsin, United States. It is located on County Highway P five miles (eight kilometers) north-northeast of the village of Denmark. The community was named for Fred N. Buckman, a banker in Denmark, Wisconsin, who was appointed the community's first postmaster in 1900.

References

Unincorporated communities in Brown County, Wisconsin
Unincorporated communities in Wisconsin
Green Bay metropolitan area